Filip Krajcik (23 July 1955 – 30 August 2001) was an Austrian tennis coach and professional player.

Born in Prague, Krajcik was the son of a former Czechoslovak Davis Cup player (Ján) and moved with his family to Vienna at age 10. He won two national championships in doubles during the 1970s and reached a best singles ranking of 227 on the professional tour, with his best Grand Prix performance a round of 16 appearance at the 1980 Paris Open.

Krajcik had a stint as captain of the Austria Davis Cup team, which included the 1990 side which reached the semi-finals of the World Group. From 1996, until his death from cancer in 2001, he captained the Austria Fed Cup team.

References

External links
 
 

1955 births
2001 deaths
Austrian male tennis players
Austrian tennis coaches
Czechoslovak emigrants to Austria
Tennis players from Prague